Frederick of Denmark may refer to:
Frederick I of Denmark (1471 – 1533), King of Denmark and Norway
Frederick II of Denmark (1534 – 1588), King of Denmark and Norway
Frederick III of Denmark (1609 – 1670)
Frederick IV of Denmark (1671 – 1730)
Frederick V of Denmark
Frederick VI of Denmark
Frederick VII of Denmark
Frederick VIII of Denmark
Frederick IX of Denmark
Frederik, Crown Prince of Denmark, the prospective Frederick X of Denmark
Frederick of Denmark (bishop)
Frederick, Hereditary Prince of Denmark